Ben L. Hall is an American politician who served as a member of the New Mexico Public Regulation Commission from the 5th district, covering all of Catron, Doña Ana, Grant, Hidalgo, Luna, Sierra, and Valencia Counties and parts of Lincoln, Otero, Socorro, and Torrance Counties.

Education 
Hall graduated from Ruidoso High School and attended New Mexico Western College for one semester.

Career 
He served three terms in the New Mexico House of Representatives and two terms on the Lincoln County Commission. For forty years, he owned and operated a general building construction company.

In 2010, Hall entered the race for Public Regulation Commissioner from the 5th district, seeking to succeed Sandy R. Jones, a Democrat. He won the Republican nomination over three other candidates with 36%, and defeated the Democratic nominee, Doña Ana County Commissioner Bill McCamley, 51-49% in the general election. He was chosen to be Chairman of the Commission in 2013 and served as president of the Western Conference of Public Utility Commissioners the same year. Running for a second term in 2014, he lost to his predecessor, Jones, 51-49%. He again ran in 2018, narrowly winning the Republican nomination over two other candidates with 36%, but lost the general election to former Democratic state Senator Stephen Fischmann 54-46%.

References

External links
 Ben L. Hall – Ballotpedia profile

21st-century American politicians
American construction businesspeople
Businesspeople from New Mexico
County commissioners in New Mexico
Living people
Republican Party members of the New Mexico House of Representatives
People from Ruidoso, New Mexico
Year of birth missing (living people)